The International Journal of Food Sciences and Nutrition is a peer-reviewed scientific journal that covers food science and nutrition. It is published by Taylor & Francis.  the editor-in-chief is Daniele Del Rio (University of Parma).

Abstracting and indexing
The journal is abstracted and indexed in BIOSIS Previews, Chemical Abstracts, Current Contents/Agriculture, Biology & Environmental Sciences, EMBASE/Excerpta Medica, Food Science & Technology Abstracts, Index Medicus/MEDLINE/PubMed, PASCAL, Scopus, and Science Citation Index Expanded. 

According to the Journal Citation Reports, the journal has a 2019 impact factor of 3.483.

References

External links

The Next Generation
Nutritional Supplements Portal

Food science journals
Taylor & Francis academic journals
English-language journals
Publications established in 1947